This is a list of etymologies of former counties of the United States, including former names of current counties.

List

References

Bibliography

 
 
Former
Former